Arby's Classic is an annual high school basketball tournament held in December at the Viking Hall, in Bristol, Tennessee.

History
During the 1982 basketball season, the Tennessee High Vikings traveled to Louisville, Kentucky to play in the King of Bluegrass Tournament. After returning to Bristol, Coach Dale Burns discussed with then Athletic Director Bill Bingham the possibility of having a similar tournament to take advantage of Tennessee High's tremendous facility, Viking Hall.

The original goals were to (1) promote basketball in the region, and (2) to expose the fans to outstanding players and teams in the country. The Arby's Classic has accomplished those goals and more. It has not only been a boost to basketball in Bristol and the region, it has been a boost to the area financially. Exciting teams and individual players resulting in packed houses have made the Arby's Classic one of the top high school basketball tournaments in the country. This is a tribute to Coach Dale Burn's astute selection of talented teams.

Originally called the Mountain Empire Classic, the Arby's Classic has been sponsored by Arby's since it began. Don Shawl, President of Arbico East, Inc. has been instrumental in building the tournament into what it is today. His hard work in funding and planning the Arby's Classic has given the tournament that special edge in quality.

Although many local groups have assisted in the growth the tournament, no organization has given more time than the Viking Booster Club. Approximately fifty people volunteer their time with many of them taking vacations from work just to be part of the Arby's Classic.

Another group of people who have given special time to the development of the tournament is the Tennessee High Coaching Staff. The Tennessee High Staff gives up much of their Christmas vacation to assist with the tournament. Their dedication and hard work produce a class event with precision timing which appears to spectators to run effortlessly.

Much of the credit for the growth of the Arby's Classic has to go to our local media. Several visiting coaches have made mention of the tremendous coverage in our area. This is a tribute to all media-newspapers, television and radio. In addition, tournament games can be heard live on local radio stations.

Through the combination of these people, the Arby's Classic has become one of the most talked about high school basketball tournaments in the country, truly living up to its name as a classic.

Past winners
1983 - Pulaski High School
1984 - Daniel Boone 
1985 - Sullivan North
1986 - Louisville Male, Kentucky
1987 - Patrick Henry-Roanoke
1988 - Dobyns-Bennett
1989 - Whites Creek, Tennessee
1990 - Whites Creek, Tennessee
1991 - Patrick Henry-Roanoke
1992 - Dobyns-Bennett
1993 - Science Hill
1994 - Augusta Westside, Georgia
1995 - Science Hill
1996 - Miami Senior, Florida
1997 - Wheeler, Georgia
1998 - Northwest Christian, Florida
1999 - Science Hill
2000 - Louisville Male, Kentucky
2001 - Louisville Ballard, Kentucky
2002 - Wheeler, Georgia
2003 - Bradley Central, Tennessee
2004 - Benjamin Mays, Georgia
2005 - Brentwood Academy, Tennessee
2006 - Dr. Michael Krop, Florida
2007 - Briarcrest Christian School, Tennessee
2008 - Boyd Anderson, Florida
2009 - Memphis Melrose, Tennessee
2010 - Columbia High School, Decatur, Georgia
2011 - Christ School, North Carolina
2012 - Urspring, Ulm, Germany
2013 - Greater Atlanta Christian School, Georgia
2014 - North Mecklenburg High School, Charlotte, NC
2015 - Wayne High School, Huber Heights, OH
2016 - Trinity High School, Louisville, KY
2017 - North Mecklenburg High School, Charlotte, NC
2018 - Bearden High School, Knoxville, TN

References
http://www.arbysclassic.net/

External links
http://www.arbysclassic.net/

Bristol, Tennessee
Basketball in Tennessee
High school basketball competitions in the United States
High school sports in Tennessee